Daniel Elfadli (born 6 April 1997) is a professional footballer who plays as a defensive midfielder for 2. Bundesliga club 1. FC Magdeburg. Born in Germany, he plays for the Libya national team.

Club career
Elfadli is a youth product of TSG Leonberg, Eltingen and Rutesheim. He began his senior career in the seventh division of Germany, the Landesliga, with Rutesheim in 2016. In 2018, he moved to Reutlingen, and his success there earned him a move to Nöttingen in the Oberliga. He spent the 2021-22 season with Aalen in the Regionalliga. 2. Bundesliga side Magdeburg scouted him, and after eight games signed him in advance of the 2022–23 season.

International career
Born in Germany, Elfadli is of Libyan descent. He was called up to the Libya national team for a set of friendlies in September 2022. He made his debut with Libya in a 0–0 friendly tie with Uganda on 21 September 2022.

References

External links
 
 
 
 Bundesliga profile

1997 births
Living people
People from Leonberg
Libyan footballers
Libya international footballers
German footballers
German people of Libyan descent
Association football midfielders
SSV Reutlingen 05 players
FC Nöttingen players
VfR Aalen players
1. FC Magdeburg players
2. Bundesliga players
Regionalliga players
Oberliga (football) players
Landesliga players